Camillo Paderni, or Camillus Paderni, lived from c. 1715 to 1781. He was an illustrator, excavator, and curator at the Museum Herculanense, as part of King Charles VII of Naples royal Palace in Portici, and a Roman.

Papyri
Paderni was possibly the first person who undertook the task of transcribing the Herculaneum papyri, obtained at the Villa of the Papyri in Herculaneum. Paderni used the method of slicing scrolls in half, copying readable text, by removing papyri layers. This transcription procedure was used for hundreds of scrolls, and in the process destroyed them.

Correspondence

In a letter from 1752 to Richard Mead, Paderni wrote:

In 1754 Paderni wrote a letter to Thomas Hollis, briefly describing the discoveries at the Villa of the Papyri:

In another letter from 1754, to Hollis, Paderni wrote:

In 1755, Paderni wrote two more letters to Thomas Hollis, briefing him on the excavation and scroll transcription progress. The following year he wrote him again, mentioning two works from Philodemus, on rhetoric and music.

Drawings
Sketches by Paderni based on other paintings, as part of George Turnbull's ca 1740 book, A treatise on ancient painting. 

Paderni drawings from a 1757 publication by Ottavio Antonio Bayardi.

References

Papyrus
Papyrology
1st-century manuscripts
Herculaneum (ancient city)
Archaeological discoveries in Italy
1700 births
Italian male painters